Omid Jahanbakhsh is an Iranian football midfielder who plays for Saipa in the Persian Gulf Pro League.

References

1994 births
Living people
Iranian footballers
People from Tehran
Saba players
Association football forwards